The following is a list of chancellors, principals, and noted alumni and professors of McGill University in Montreal, Quebec, Canada.

List of chancellors 

 Charles Dewey Day (1864–1884)
 James Ferrier (1884–1888)
 Sir Donald Alexander Smith, Lord Strathcona (1889–1914)
 Sir William Christopher Macdonald (1914–1917)
 Sir Robert Laird Borden (1918–1920)
 Sir Edward Wentworth Beatty (1921–1942)
 Morris Watson Wilson (1943–1946)
 Orville Sievwright Tyndale (BA 1908, MA 1909, BCL 1915) (1946–1952)
 Bertie Charles Gardner (1952–1957)
 Ray Edwin Powell (1957–1964)
 Howard Irwin Ross (BA 1930) (1964–1970)
 Donald Olding Hebb (MA, 1932) (1970–1974)
 Stuart Milner Finlayson (1975)
 Conrad Fetherstonhaugh Harrington (BA 1933, BCL 1936) (1976–1984)
 A. Jean de Grandpré (BCL 1943) (1984–1991)
 Gretta Chambers (BA 1947) (1991–1999)
 Richard W. Pound (BCom 1962, LAcc 1964, BCL 1967) (1999–2009)
 H. Arnold Steinberg (BCom 1954) (2009–2014)
 Michael A. Meighen (BA 1960) (2014–2021)
 John McCall MacBain (2021–present)

List of principals 

 George Jehoshaphat Mountain (1824–1835)
 John Bethune (1835–1846)
 Edmund Allen Meredith (1846–1853)
 Sir John William Dawson (1855–1893)
 Sir William Peterson (1895–1919)
 Sir Auckland Campbell Geddes (1919–1920)
 General Sir Arthur Currie (1920–1933)
 Arthur Eustace Morgan (1935–1937)
 Lewis Williams Douglas (1938–1939)
 Frank Cyril James (1939–1962)
 Harold Rocke Robertson (BSc 1932, MD 1936) (1962–1970)
 Robert Edward Bell (PhD 1948) (1970–1979)
 David Lloyd Johnston (1979–1994)
 Bernard Shapiro (BA, 1956) (1994–2002)
 Heather Munroe-Blum (2003–2013)
 Suzanne Fortier (BSc 1972, PhD 1976) (2013–2022)
 H. Deep Saini (2023–present)

Noted alumni and professors

Nobel Prize graduates and faculty members

Academy Award graduates

Pulitzer Prize graduates

Academics and scholars
 Maude Abbott (BA 1890) - physician and pathologist, authority on congenital heart disease, co-founder of International Academy of Pathology
 Nancy J. Adler – Professor of Organizational Behavior and Samuel Bronfman Chair in Management at McGill University
 Abdolhamid Akbarzadeh Shafaroudi – assistant professor in machine design and mechanical engineering at McGill University
 Selim Akl (MSc 1976, PhD, 1978) – unconventional computer scientist
 Ismail al-Faruqi – Muslim philosopher and comparative religion scholar
 Alia Al-Saji – professor of philosophy
 Antony Alcock (BA 1961) – Ulster historian; actively involved in the negotiations leading up to the Belfast Agreement
 Brian Alters – evolution and education
 Frederick Andermann (BA 1948, BSc 1952) – neuroscientist
 Athanasios Asimakopulos (BA 1951, MA 1953) – prominent economist in the Post Keynesian tradition
 Brigitte Askonas (BSc 1944, MSc 1949) – prominent British immunologist
 Karine Auclair – professor of chemistry at McGill University and Canada Research Chair in Antimicrobials and Green Enzymes
 Francis Aveling (BA 1897, MA 1899) – Canadian psychologist, divinity scholar, and Roman Catholic priest
 Sir David Baulcombe, FRS (Postdoc 1978) – British plant scientist and geneticist; now Professor of Botany at the University of Cambridge
 Jill Beck (MA 1976) – dance and choreography scholar, and 15th President of Lawrence University
 Eric Berne (BSc 1931, MD 1935) – psychiatrist, originator of the psychoanalytic theory of transactional analysis
 Raoul Bott (BEng 1945, MEng 1948) – mathematician specializing in topology, Wolf Prize in Mathematics, 2000
 Reuven Brenner – economist; current faculty member
 Ayşe Buğra (PhD 1981) – economist
 Gerald Bull – former professor of mechanical engineering; expert on projectiles; designer of the Iraqi Project Babylon
 Mario Bunge – physicist and philosopher
 Miriam Burland – astronomer at Dominion Observatory from 1927 to 1967
 Ron Burnett (PhD 1981) – president and vice-chancellor, Emily Carr University of Art and Design; former Director of the Graduate Program in Communications, McGill University
 Anne Carson – thinker, writer, translator, and University of Michigan classics professor
 Donald Ewen Cameron – psychiatrist, involved with mind control experimentation at McGill
 Thomas Chang (BSc 1957, MD 1961, PhD 1965) – invented and developed world's first artificial cell
 Margaret Ridley Charlton – historian, pioneer librarian, and one of the founders of the Medical Library Association
Sherry Chou (MD 2001) – Neurologist and critical care physician at the University of Pittsburgh
Sujit Choudhry (BSc 1992) –  constitutionalist and Dean of the University of California Berkeley, School of Law
 Thomas H. Clark – paleontologist; namesake of the mineral Thomasclarkite
 Terence Coderre (PhD 1985) – Professor of Medicine and the Harold Griffith Chair in Anaesthesia Research at McGill University
 Robert W. Cox (BA 1946) – former United Nations official; a leading authority of the British school of International Political Economy; former professor of political science at Columbia University; current professor emeritus at York University
 R. F. Patrick Cronin (MD 1953) – cardiologist; Dean of the Faculty of Medicine at McGill (1972–1977); healthcare consultant
 Augusto Claudio Cuello – Professor in the Department of Pharmacology and Therapeutics and Charles E. Frosst/Merck Chair in Pharmacology at McGill University
 Philip J. Currie (MSc 1975, PhD 1981) – paleontologist and former curator of the Royal Tyrrell Museum of Palaeontology
 Roger Daley (MSc 1968, PhD 1971) – meteorologist
 Armand de Mestral (BCL 1966) – professor of international law
 Carrie Derick (BEd 1881, BA 1890, MSc 1896) – first woman to become a professor in Canada (in botany at McGill)
 Arti Dhand (PhD 2000) – associate professor at the University of Toronto, Department for the Study of Religion
Vibert Douglas (PhD 1926) – astrophysicist
 Charles R. Drew (MD 1933) – physician and professor
 Kyle Elliott – Canadian ornithologist, assistant professor in the Department of Natural Resource Sciences at McGill University, and Canada Research Chair in Arctic Ecology.
 Hamid Etemad – professor of international business; business guru and researcher
 Jennifer V. Evans – professor at Carleton University
 Basil Favis - Canadian chemist and professor
 David A. Freedman (BSc 1958) – statistician; professor at University of California, Berkeley
 Grover Furr (BA 1965) – professor of English literature; historical negationist and apologist for Joseph Stalin
 James E. Gill (BSc 1921) – geology professor who introduced the Master's of Applied Science in Mineral Exploration program and established an analytical laboratory for the application of geochemistry to mineral exploration
 Gilbert Girdwood – professor of chemistry; radiologist
 Leo Goldberger (BA 1951, MA 1952) – psychologist, professor at New York University and director of the Research Center for Mental Health, Holocaust survivor
 Lawrence Goodridge, food safety and wastewater monitoring researcher
 Phil Gold (BSc 1957, MSc 1961, M.D. 1961, PhD 1965) – Canadian physician, scientist, and professor. In 1968, he co-discovered the carcinoembryonic antigen (CEA), which resulted in a blood test used in the diagnosis and management of people with cancer.
 David Goltzman (BSc 1966, MD 1968) – endocrinologist, Professor of Medicine and Physiology, and A.G. Massabki Chair in Medicine at McGill University
 Shyamala Gopalan – breast cancer researcher in the Faculty of Medicine and McGill-affiliated Lady Davis Institute for Medical Research; mother of U.S. Vice President Kamala Harris
 Jack Gross (PhD 1949) an endocrinologist, one the co-discoverers of Triiodothyronine (T3)
 William W. Happ - (BS) - Silicon transistor pioneer at Shockley Semiconductor Laboratory, and Professor at Arizona State University
John Harnad (BSc 1967) – Mathematical physicist, Director, Mathematical physics laboratory, Centre de recherches mathématiques
Stevan Harnad (BA 1967, MA 1969) – Canada Research Chair, Cognitive Sciences; open access and animal rights activist
 S. I. Hayakawa (MA 1928) – linguist, U.S. Senator, and 9th President of San Francisco State University
Karen S. Haynes (MSW 1970) – American college administrator and social worker, former president of University of Houston–Victoria, and current president of California State University San Marcos 
 Donald Olding Hebb (MA, 1932) – father of cognitive psychobiology; pioneer in artificial intelligence; developed concept of Hebbian learning
 John Hemming (BA 1957) – explorer
 Janyne M. Hodder (BA 1970, MA 1982) – educational psychologist and 6th President of the University of the Bahamas
 Alma Howard (BSc 1934, MSc, 1936, PhD 1938) – radiobiologist
 Fumiko Ikawa-Smith – archaeologist in East Asian and Japanese archaeology & administrator, Director of the Centre for East Asian Studies (1983 and 1988) and Associate Vice-Principal (Academic) of McGill University (1991–1996). 
 Herbert Jasper – neuroscientist
 Julian Jaynes (BA 1944) – psychologist, author of The Origin of Consciousness in the Breakdown of the Bicameral Mind
 George Karpati – neuroscientist
 Victoria Kaspi (BSc 1989) – astrophysicist researching neutron stars and pulsars
 Roger Keesing – anthropologist
 Howard Atwood Kelly – member of the faculty of medicine at McGill; one of the "Big Four" founding professors at the Johns Hopkins Hospital, credited with establishing gynecology as a true specialty
 Frances Oldham Kelsey (Bsc 1934, MSc 1935) – pharmacologist and physician
 Raymond Klibansky – philosopher
 Normand Landry (PhD 2010) – professor of communication at Université TÉLUQ and current Canada Research Chair in Media Education and Human Rights
 Harold Laski – political theorist
 Charles Philippe Leblond – pioneer of stem cells, inventor of autoradiography
 Grant LeMarquand (BA 1977, STM 1982, MA 1998) – Canadian Anglican bishop, missionary, and professor at Trinity School for Ministry
 Daniel Levitin – cognitive psychologist
 Pericles Lewis (BA 1990) – founding President of Yale-NUS College; professor of English and comparative literature at Yale University
 Abraham S. Luchins – American psychologist known for his research on mental sets (Einstellung effect) 
 Michael J. MacKenzie – Professor of Social Work, Psychiatry, and Pediatrics at McGill University, and Canada Research Chair in Child Well-Being
 Michael Mackey – professor of physiology and Joseph Morley Drake Chair in Physiology at McGill University
 Colin MacLeod (MD 1932) – Canadian-American geneticist; discovered DNA breakthroughs
 James Mallory – for many years Canada's leading constitutional scholar
 Joseph Boyd Martin – former Dean of the Harvard Medical School; former Dean and Chancellor at the University of California, San Francisco; former chair of neurology and neurosurgery at the Montreal Neurological Institute
 Michael Meaney  – pioneer of epigenetics; James McGill Professor, Departments of Psychiatry and Neurology and Neurosurgery.
 Ronald Melzack (BA, 1950, MSc 1951, PhD 1954) – developed the McGill Pain Questionnaire
Ravi S. Menon (MSc(A), 1986) - Canadian-American biophysicist involved in the development of functional magnetic resonance imaging, Professor at The University of Western Ontario.
 John S. Meyer (MD 1948, MSc 1949) – neurology professor and Chairman of the U.S. President's Commission on Heart Disease, Cancer and Stroke
 Brenda Milner (MA 1949, PhD 1952) – provided the first clear demonstration of the existence of multiple memory systems in the brain with patient H.M.
 Henry Mintzberg (BEng 1961) – business guru
 Mortimer Mishkin (MA 1949, PhD 1951) – renowned neuropsychologist for path-breaking work on brain-processing of memories and 2009 National Medal of Science recipient
 Albert Moll (LLB 1932, MD 1937) – professor of psychiatry; pioneer of psychiatric day treatment
 Marie-Eve Morin – Canadian philosopher and Professor of Philosophy
 Karl Moore – associate professor of management at McGill University
 William Reginald Morse, MD, one of four medical missionaries who founded the West China Union University in Chengdu, Sichuan, in 1914; went on to become dean of the medical faculty and, later, assistant researcher at the Peabody Museum, where he advanced studies of Chinese and Tibetan medicine
 Beverley Pearson Murphy, endocrinologist and professor
 Jennifer G. Murphy (BS 2000) – Professor of chemistry at University of Toronto
 E. R. Ward Neale (BSc 1949) – geologist, professor at Memorial University of Newfoundland
 Louis Nirenberg (BS, 1945) – mathematician; 1995 National Medal of Science recipient and winner of 2015 Abel Prize
 Percy Erskine Nobbs – former professor of architecture; designer of many buildings in Montreal, especially at McGill, and in Alberta, British Columbia, and South Africa
 James Olds (Postdoc 1955) – neuroscientist and psychologist; co-discovered the reward center of the brain; a founder of modern neuroscience
 Kelvin Ogilvie – McGill chemistry professor 1974-87
 Santa J. Ono (PhD 1991) – immunologist; 15th President & Vice-Chancellor of The University of British Columbia; 28th President of The University of Cincinnati; 15th President of the University of Michigan; discovered NFX1 RING Finger motif; showed HMGA2 truncation drives mesenchymal tumor development
 William Osler (MD 1872) – McGill professor; medical pioneer; developed the modern form of a doctor's bedside manner; a founder of the Johns Hopkins School of Medicine at Johns Hopkins University
 Gilles Paradis – public health and preventive medicine physician at the Institut national de santé publique du Québec, as well as professor in the Department of Epidemiology, Biostatistics, and Occupational Health and Strathcona Chair in Epidemiology at McGill University.
Madhu Pai – Canada Research Chair of Epidemiology and Global Health at McGill University
 Arthur Lindo Patterson (BSc 1923, MSc 1924, PhD 1928) – physicist
 Jordan Peterson (PhD 1991, Postdoc 1993) – clinical psychologist, cultural critic, and psychology professor currently at the University of Toronto
 Kevin Petrecca – neurosurgical oncologist at the Montreal Neurological Institute, chief of neurosurgery at the MUHC, associate professor of neurology and neurosurgery and William Feindel Chair in Neuro-Oncology at McGill University
 Wilder Penfield – neurosurgery pioneer; first director of the Montreal Neurological Institute and Montreal Neurological Hospital, which are affiliated with McGill University
Stephen R. Perry, John J. O'Brien Professor of Law and Professor of Philosophy at the University of Pennsylvania Law School
 Steven Pinker (BA 1976) – cognitive psychologist; author of The Blank Slate, How the Mind Works
 Susan Pinker (BA 1979) – psychologist; author of The Sexual Paradox
Jeremy Quastel – mathematician specializing in probability theory and PDEs, currently professor at the University of Toronto
 Judah Hirsch Quastel – biochemist; pioneer in neurochemistry and soil metabolism; Director of the McGill University-Montreal General Hospital Research Institute
 Amélie Quesnel-Vallée – associate professor with joint appointment in the Departments of Sociology and Epidemiology, and Canada Research Chair in Policies and Health Inequalities at McGill
 Fazlur Rahman – Islamic philosopher
 James R. Reid (BA 1881, MDiv 1883) – theologian and president of College of Montana (1889–1893) and Montana State University (1894–1904)
 Richard Birdsall Rogers (BEng 1878) – civil engineer and designer of the Peterborough Lift Lock
 Christopher E. Rudd (BSc 1978) – immunologist; professor at Harvard and Cambridge
 Witold Rybczynski (BArch 1966, MArch 1972) – Scottish-born McGill-trained architect and internationally known writer and critic
 Philip Carl Salzman – anthropologist
 Joseph A. Schwarcz (BSc 1969, PhD 1973) – chemist, science popularizer, science journalist
 Hans Selye — (DSc, 1942) Endocrinologist, pioneered studies on the effects of stress on the human body.
 Justine Sergent (BA, 1973, MSc 1979, PhD 1982) – neuroscientist
 Bernard Shapiro (BA, 1956) – Ethics Commissioner of Canada; former Principal of McGill and Deputy Education Minister of Ontario; twin brother of Harold Shapiro
 Harold Shapiro (BA, 1956, MA 1959) – former president of Princeton University; former president of the University of Michigan; twin brother of Bernard Shapiro
 Judith N. Shklar (BA, 1949, MA 1950) – political scientist, John Cowles Professor of Government at Harvard, and first woman president of the American Political Science Association (APSA)
 Vera Shlakman (BA 1930, MA 1931) – professor of economics, noted Marxist scholar, and author of famous book on women factory workers
 Jenni Sidey (BEng 2011) – Canadian astronaut, engineer, and lecturer.
 Upinder Singh (PhD 1990) – Indian historian 
 Nahum Sonenberg – Israeli Canadian microbiologist and biochemist. He is a James McGill professor of biochemistry
 M. R. Srinivasan (MEng 1952, PhD 1954) – Indian Nuclear Physicist
 Moshe Szyf – geneticist, pioneer of epigenetics; James McGill professor of pharmacology and therapeutics.
 Charles Taylor (BA 1952) – writer, philosopher, and political theorist; 2007 winner of the Templeton Prize
 Karen Teff (PhD 1988) - biologist and geneticist
 Demetri Terzopoulos  (BEng 1978, MEng 1980) - Academy Award winning Greek-Canadian-American computer scientist, university professor, author, and entrepreneur
 Marc Tessier-Lavigne (BSc 1980) – 11th and current president of Stanford University; former president of Rockefeller University; Rhodes scholar
 Wendy Thomson - former head of School of Social Work and current vice-chancellor of University of London, 2019-
 Lionel Tiger (BA 1959) – best-selling author; Darwin Professor of Anthropology at Rutgers University
 Peter Todd (BCom 1983) – former dean of McGill's Desautels Faculty of Management, dean of HEC Paris
 Stephen Toope (BCL, 1983 LLB, 1983) – Vice-Chancellor of the University of Cambridge (2017–), President of the University of British Columbia (2006–2014)
 Bruce Trigger – OC OQ FRSC (18 June 1937 – 1 December 2006) archaeologist, anthropologist, and ethnohistorian. James McGill Professor (2001–2006), Professor McGill University (1967–2006). 
Tom Velk – monetary economics and public policy professor
Manuella Vincter - particle physicist, professor at Carleton University, deputy spokesperson of the ATLAS experiment
Jacob Viner (BA 1914) – professor; early leader of the Chicago school of economics
Robert Vogel (academic) - professor; Dean of Faculty of Arts of McGill University
Alice Vrielink – Head of Discipline in Biochemistry and Molecular Biology at the University of Western Australia; conducts research in crystallography
 Immanuel Wallerstein – former professor of sociology (1971–1976); political scientist, known for the World Systems Theory
Jagannath Wani (PhD 1967) – statistics professor and philanthropist focusing on mental illness awareness
Frank T. M. White – Foundation Professor, Mining and Metallurgical Engineering, University of Queensland; Macdonald Professor of Mining Engineering and Applied Geophysics, McGill University
 Franklin White (MD 1969) – scholar-practitioner; former president, Canadian Public Health Association; 1997 Medal of Honor from the Pan American Health Organization (PAHO/WHO)
Joseph Wong, Vice President, International, University of Toronto
Tim Wu (BSc 1995) – professor at Columbia Law School; adviser for the New York State Attorney General
Leo Yaffe (PhD 1943) - nuclear chemist
 Bernard P. Zeigler (BEng 1962) – a Canadian engineer and emeritus professor at the University of Arizona, known for inventing Discrete Event System Specification (DEVS) in 1976.
 Hans Zingg (PhD) – Professor Emeritus of Pharmacology and Therapeutics, Professor of Medicine, Professor of Obstetrics and Gynecology, and Wyeth-Ayerst Chair in Women's Health at McGill
 Bernard Zinman (MD) –  research endocrinologist, clinician, and diabetes expert

Business and media
Suhayya Abu-Hakima – co-founder and CEO of AmikaNow! and Amika Mobile Corporation
 Noubar Afeyan ― one of two Canadian co-founders of Moderna, Inc.
 Vinod Agarwal – founder and former chairman of LogicVision ($100 million NASDAQ traded company)
Suroosh Alvi – journalist, filmmaker, and co-founder of VICE magazine
 Peyush Bansal- co-founder and CEO at Lenskart, an Indian unicorn. Investor at Shark Tank India.
 Aldo Bensadoun – founder and CEO of the ALDO Group
 Conrad Black – imprisoned press baron and media tycoon in the Anglo-Canadian tradition of Lord Beaverbrook and Lord Thomson of Fleet; owner of 650 dailies/weeklies around the world
Gad Elmaleh – French comedian
 Charles Bronfman – philanthropist; former Co-Chairman of Seagram Distillers
 Edgar Bronfman, Sr. – former CEO of Seagram
 John Cleghorn – former chairman of the Royal Bank of Canada, the largest bank in Canada; currently chairman of SNC-Lavalin group
 Jim Coleman (1911–2001), Canadian sports journalist, writer and press secretary
 Jean Coutu – businessman; billionaire; founder and CEO of Jean Coutu Group
 Paul Desmarais, Jr. – chairman of Power Corporation
Ritika Dutt – CEO & co-founder of Botler AI
 Darren Entwistle – president and chief executive officer of Telus
 Adam Gopnik – staff writer for The New Yorker magazine
 Céline Galipeau – weekday anchor of Ici Radio-Canada Télé's Le Téléjournal
Kuok Khoon Hong – Singaporean billionaire and co-founder of Wilmar International
 Dick Irvin, Jr. – sports broadcaster and author; second longest serving member of CBC's Hockey Night in Canada (after Bob Cole)
 Hubert Lacroix – president and CEO of the Canadian Broadcasting Corporation
 David Lawee – partner and founder of Google Capital
 John MacBain – founder, CEO and president of Trader Classified Media
 Shahid Mahmood – political cartoonist
 Scott McDonald – CEO of Oliver Wyman
 Thomas S. Monahan – president and CEO of CIBC Mellon
 Claude Mongeau – CEO and president of the Canadian National Railway
 Harley Morenstein – host and co-creator of Epic Meal Time
 Andy Nulman – co-founder of Just for Laughs
 Mark Phillips – CBS News London bureau correspondent since 1982, formerly CBC News London correspondent
 Elizabeth Plank – Vox video blogger and online journalist
 Robert Rabinovitch – president and CEO of the Canadian Broadcasting Corporation
 Jade Raymond video game producer at Ubisoft; co-host of G4TV's Electronic Playground
Matthew Rosenberg – Washington correspondent at The New York Times, and national security analyst for CNN
 John Roth – former CEO of Nortel Networks
 Calin Rovinescu – president and CEO of Air Canada
 Claire Saffitz – American pastry chef, food writer and YouTube personality
 Sugar Sammy - Canadian comedian
 Seymour Schulich – benefactor to the Schulich School of Music at McGill and Schulich School of Business, York University
 Allan Scott – writer-producer of more than 20 feature films, including Don't Look Now, voted the best British film of all time; wrote Priscilla, Queen of the Desert; as chairman of Macallan-Glenlivet, he turned Macallan into a world-leading malt whisky
 Savik Shuster – TV journalist working for Ukrainian television
 Evan Solomon – political journalist and radio host on Sirius XM Canada, columnist for Maclean's 
 Helga Stephenson – interim CEO of the Academy of Canadian Cinema and Television
 Ziya Tong – television personality and co-host of Daily Planet
 Lorne Trottier – founder of Matrox Electronic Systems
 Ivana Trump – Czech-American businesswoman and former fashion model, ex-wife of President Donald Trump
 Les Vadasz – founding member of Intel Corporation
 Zain Verjee – co-anchor of CNN International's European morning program World Report
 Michelle Zatlyn – co-founder, president, and COO of Cloudflare
 Moses Znaimer – co-founder and former president and executive producer of CityTV; Chairman and Executive Producer of the Access Media Group
 Mort Zuckerman – CEO of Atlantic Monthly Corporation and publisher of U.S. News & World Report
 Changpeng Zhao - founder and CEO of Binance, the world's largest cryptocurrency exchange.

Politics and government

Canadian politicians and civil servants
McGill alumni have held and continue to hold many positions at the federal and provincial levels in Canadian politics:

Governors-General of Canada
 Julie Payette (BEng 1986) – Governor General of Canada, 2017–2021; former Canadian Space Agency astronaut
 David Lloyd Johnston (LLD 2000) – Governor General of Canada, 2010–2017; former McGill principal; former head of the Board of Overseers at Harvard University; former president of the University of Waterloo, 1999–2011

Prime ministers
 Sir John Abbott (BCL 1854) – third Prime Minister of Canada and first to be born in Canada
 Sir Wilfrid Laurier (BCL 1864) – seventh Prime Minister of Canada
 Justin Trudeau (BA 1994) – 23rd and current prime minister of Canada

Cabinet ministers and members of parliament
 Chris Alexander (BA 1989) – Minister of Citizenship and Immigration, 2013–2015; previously Canadian ambassador to Afghanistan, 2003–2005
Warren Allmand (BCL 1952) – served variously as Solicitor General, Minister of Indian Affairs and Northern Development, and Minister of Consumer and Corporate Affairs between 1972 and 1979
Steven Blaney (Cert Mgmt 1991) – Minister of Public Safety and Emergency Preparedness, 2013–2015
Jim Carr (BA 1979) – Minister of Natural Resources, 2015–
Brooke Claxton (BCL 1946) – Minister of Health, 1943–1946; Minister of National Defence, 1946–1954
 Irwin Cotler (BA 1961, BCL 1964) – Minister of Justice and Attorney General, 2003–2006
 Charles Doherty (BCL 1876, Hon. LLD 1913) – Minister of Justice and Attorney General, 1911–1921
 Charles Drury (BCL 1936) – Minister of Finance, Defence, Public Works, Industry, President of the Treasury Board
 Sydney Arthur Fisher (BA 1868)— Minister of Agriculture, 1896–1911 
 Karina Gould (BA 2010) – Minister of Democratic Institutions, 2017–present
 Herb Gray (BCom 1952) – Deputy Prime Minister of Canada, 1997–2002
 Don Johnston (BA 1955, BCL 1958) – Minister of State for Science and Technology, Minister of State for Economic and Regional Development, and Minister of Justice and Attorney General of Canada 
 Robert Layton (BA 1947) – Minister of State for Mines, 1984–1988
 John McCallum (PhD 1977) – Minister of Immigration, Refugees and Citizenship of Canada since 2015; former Dean of the Faculty of Arts of McGill University
 David Lametti (BCL/LLB 1989) – Minister of Justice, 2019–
 Catherine McKenna (LLB 1999) – Minister of the Environment and Climate Change, 2015–
 Frederick Debartzch Monk (BCL 1877) – Minister of Public Works, 1911–1912
 Joe Oliver (BA 1961, BCL 1964) – Minister of Finance, 2014–2015
 Jim Peterson (DCL 1970) – Minister of International Trade, 2003–2006
 Greg Rickford (BCL/LLB 2005) – Minister of Natural Resources, 2014–2015
 Richard Fadden (BA 1973) – former Deputy Minister of National Defence and National Security Advisor
 John Joseph Curran (LLB 1862) – first Solicitor General of Canada
 Jonathan Wilkinson (MA 1992) 
Nick Whalen (LLB 2011) Lawyer and former MP for the Liberal
 Julie Dzerowicz (Bcom 1994) 
 Arif Virani (BA 1994) 
 Julie Dabrusin (BA 1994) 
 Angelo Iacono (BA 1988) 
 Steven Blaney (Cert Mgmt 1991) 
 Matthew Dubé (BA 2011) 
 Brenda Shanahan (BSW 2007) 
 Michael Levitt (politician) (Arts 1993) 
 Francis Scarpaleggia (BA 1979) 
 Sherry Romanado (Cert PR Mgmt 2005) 
 Anthony Housefather (BCL/LLB 1993) 
 Thomas Mulcair (BCL 1976, LLB 1977) 
 Will Amos (BCL/LLB 2004) 
 Peter Schiefke (MSc 2011) 
Marc Miller (BCL/LLB 2001) Lawyer and MP for the Liberal current Minister of Indigenous Services in the Federal Cabinet
 Joël Lightbound (BCL/LLB 2011), Liberal politician, MP for the riding of Louis-Hébert.
 Emmanuella Lambropoulos (BEd 2013) 
 Raquel Dancho (BA 2014) 
 Mylène Freeman (BA 2011) 
 Charmaine Borg (BA 2011) 
 Laurin Liu (BA 2011)

Supreme Court justices
 Douglas Abbott (BCL 1918) – appointed to the Court in 1954, previously Minister of National Defence and Minister of Finance
 Ian Binnie (BA 1960) – appointed to the Court in 1998, formerly Associate Deputy Minister of Justice
 Louis-Philippe de Grandpré (BCL 1938) – appointed to the Court in 1974, formerly president of the Canadian Bar Association
 Marie Deschamps (LLM 1983) – appointed to the Court in 2002, previously a Judge on the Quebec Court of Appeal
 Gérald Fauteux – appointed to the Court in 1949, previously dean of the Faculty of Law. 
 Morris Fish (BA 1959, BCL 1962) – appointed to the Court in 2003, previously a Judge on the Quebec Court of Appeal
 Clément Gascon (BCL 1981) – appointed to the Court in 2014, previously a Judge on the Quebec Court of Appeal
 Désiré Girouard (BCL 1860) – appointed to the Court in 1895, previously member of Parliament
 Charles Gonthier (BCL 1951) – served on the Supreme Court 1989–2003
 Mahmud Jamal (BCL’93, LLB’93), puisne justice of the Supreme Court of Canada — appointed to the Court in 2021, previously a Judge on the Court of Appeal for Ontario
 Nicholas Kasirer (BCL, LLB 1985) – appointed to the court in 2019, previously a judge on the Quebec Court of Appeal
 Gerald Le Dain (BCL 1949) – appointed to the Court in 1984, previously a Judge on the Federal Court of Appeal
Sheilah Martin (BCL, LLB, 1981), – appointed to the Court in 2017, previously judge of the Court of Appeal of Alberta
 Pierre-Basile Mignault (BCL 1878) – appointed to the Court in 1918, previously President of the Bar of Montréal
 Thibaudeau Rinfret (BCL 1900) – appointed to the Court in 1924, previously a Judge on the Superior Court of Quebec

Senators
 Albert Joseph Brown (BA 1883, BCL 1886) – Senator for Wellington, 1932–1938
 Henry Joseph Cloran (BCL 1883) – Senator for Victoria, Quebec, 1903–1928
 Sheila Finestone (BSc 1947) – appointed to the Senate of Canada in 1999
 Joan Fraser (BA 1965) – appointed to the Canadian Senate in 1998
 Linda Frum (BA 1984) – appointed to the Senate in 2009
 Marc Gold (BA 1972) – current Senator for Stadacona, Quebec
 Sir William Hales Hingston (MD CM 1851) – Senator for Rougemont, 1896–1907; Mayor of Montreal, 1875–1877
 James Horace King (MD CM 1895) – Leader of the Government in the Senate, 1942–1945
 Michael Meighen (BA 1960) – appointed to the Senate in 1990
 Vivienne Poy (BA 1962) – appointed to the Senate in 1998
 Larry Smith (BCL 1976) – appointed to the Senate in 2011 and Leader of the Opposition in the Senate
 Leo Housakos (BA 1992) – incumbent Senator for Wellington, Quebec and former Speaker of the Senate of Canada
 James Edwin Robertson (BA 1865) – Member of Parliament and Senator for Prince Edward Island
 Michael Pitfield (LLB 1959) – Senator for Ottawa-Vanier, Ontario
 Joan Fraser (BA 1965) – Senator for De Lorimier, Quebec
 John Caswell Davis (BEng 1910) – Senator for Winnipeg, Manitoba
 Charles Boucher de Boucherville (MD 1843) – third Premier of Quebec and Senator for Montarville, Quebec
 Sarto Fournier (LLB 1937) – Member of Parliament, 38th Mayor of Montreal, and Senator for De Lanaudière, Quebec
 Théodore Robitaille (MD 1858) – Member of Parliament, and Senator for Gulf, Quebec

Members of Parliament (House of Commons)
 Tom Mulcair (BCL 1976, LLB 1977): Leader of the New Democratic Party, Leader of the Opposition, and Member of Parliament for Outremont, Quebec
Marc Miller (BCL, LLB 2001): Current Member of Parliament for Ville-Marie—Le Sud-Ouest—Île-des-Sœurs, Quebec, and Parliamentary Secretary to the Minister of Crown–Indigenous Relations
 David Lametti (BCL 1989, LLB 1989): Current Member of Parliament for LaSalle—Émard—Verdun, Quebec, and Parliamentary Secretary to the Minister of Innovation, Science and Economic Development
 Arif Virani (BA 1994): Current Member of Parliament for Parkdale—High Park, Ontario, and Parliamentary Secretary to the Minister of Justice and Attorney General of Canada
 Murray Rankin (BA 1972): Former Member of Parliament for Victoria, British Columbia, and current Member of the Legislative Assembly of British Columbia for Oak Bay-Gordon Head and British Columbia Minister of Indigenous Relations and Reconciliation
 Anthony Housefather (BCL, LLB 1993): Current Member of Parliament for Mount Royal, Quebec, and chair of the House of Commons Standing Committee on Justice and Human Rights
 Albina Guarnieri (MA 1979): Member of Parliament for Mississauga East and Mississauga East—Cooksville, Ontario
 George MacKinnon (MD 1902): Member of Parliament for Kootenay East, British Columbia
Christophe-Alphonse Geoffrion (BCL 1866): Member of Parliament for Verchères, Quebec
 Joseph Alexandre Camille Madore (BCL 1880): Member of Parliament for Hochelaga, Quebec
 Jack Layton (BA 1969): Leader of the New Democratic Party, Leader of the Opposition, and Member of Parliament for Toronto—Danforth, Ontario
Samuel William Jacobs (BCL 1893): Member of Parliament for George-Étienne Cartier and Cartier, Quebec
 Alan Macnaughton (BA 1924, BCL 1927): Member of Parliament for Mount Royal, Quebec, and Speaker of the House of Commons
 Thomas d'Arcy McGee (BCL 1861): A Father of the Canadian Confederation and prominent Member of Parliament for Montreal West, Quebec
 The "McGill 5": Five then-current McGill students who were elected as NDP MPs in 2011:
 Charmaine Borg (BA 2011): MP for Terrebonne—Blainville (2011–2015)
 Matthew Dubé (BA 2011): MP for Beloeil—Chambly (Chambly—Borduas until 2015) (2011–2019)
 Mylène Freeman (BA 2011): MP for Argenteuil—Papineau—Mirabel (2011–2015)
 Laurin Liu (BA 2016): MP for Rivière-des-Mille-Îles (2011–2015)
 Jamie Nicholls (PhD cand 2017): MP for Vaudreuil—Soulanges (2011–2015)

Auditors-general
 Denis Desautels (BCom 1964) – auditor general, 1991–2001
 Sheila Fraser (BCom 1972) – first female auditor general of Canada

Ambassadors
 Arnold Heeney (BCL 1927) – ambassador to the United States and NATO
 Kirsten Hillman (law degree) - ambassador to the United States, 2020-
 Guillermo Rishchynski (BA 1975) – ambassador to the United Nations, Brazil, Mexico and Colombia
 Ralph Lysyshyn (BA 1969) – ambassador to Russia
 Sydney David Pierce (BA 1922, BCL 1925) – ambassador to Brazil, Belgium, Luxembourg, Mexico, and the OECD
 Yves Fortier (BCL 1958) – ambassador to the United Nations
 Chris Alexander (BA 1989) – ambassador to Afghanistan 
 David Wright (BA 1966) –  Ambassador to Spain and NATO
 Andrew McNaughton (BA 1910, MSc 1912) – ambassador to the United Nations and President of the UN Security Council
 Frederic Bertley (BSc 1994, PhD 1999) – ambassador to Senegal
 James R. Wright (BA 1970) – ambassador (high commissioner) to the United Kingdom
 Robert Fowler (BA 1966) – ambassador to the United Nations and Under-Secretary-General of the United Nations
 Élaine Ayotte (MA 1990) – ambassador and permanent delegate to the UNESCO
 Gordon Smith (BA 1968) – Ambassador to the European Union and NATO
 John McCallum (PhD 1977) – ambassador to China
 John Rankin (law degree) – former British ambassador to Nepal; Governor of Bermuda; current British Governor of British Virgin Islands

Heads of financial institutions
 Graham Towers (BA 1919) – first and founding Governor of the Bank of Canada (1934–1955) and Governor for Canada at the International Monetary Fund
 Marcel Massé (LLB 1961) – Member of Parliament, President of the Treasury Board, and President of the Canadian International Development Agency
 Sylvia Ostry (BA 1948, MA 1950) – chairman, Economic Council of Canada

Others
 Gerald Butts (BA 1993, MA 1996) – current Principal Secretary to the Prime Minister of Canada, 2015–
 Sir Charles Boucher de Boucherville (MD 1843) – Premier of Quebec, 1874–1878, 1891–1892
 Ian Brodie (BA 1990) – Chief of Staff in the government of Prime Minister Stephen Harper, 2006–2008
 Neil Brown, Q.C. (PhD. 1973) – Alberta MLA
 Rosemary Brown – first Black Canadian woman to be elected to a provincial legislature
 James Campbell Clouston (BEng 1918) – Canadian officer in the British Royal Navy, who acted as pier-master during the Dunkirk evacuation; inspiration for Kenneth Branagh's pier-master character in Christopher Nolan's 2017 film Dunkirk
 May Cutler (BA 1945, MA 1951) – first woman to serve as Mayor of Westmount, Quebec (1987–1991); founder of Tundra Books; first female Canadian publisher of children's books
 Sir Charles Peers Davidson (BA 1864, MA 1867, BCL 1873, DCL 1875, Hon. LLD 1912) – Chief Justice of the Quebec Superior Court, 1912–1915
 Henry Thomas Duffy (BA 1876, BCL 1879) – Minister of Public Works and Treasurer of Quebec
 Brian Gallant (LLM 2011) – Premier of New Brunswick, 2014–
 R. A. E. Greenshields (BA 1883, BCL 1885) – Chief Justice of the Superior Court of the Province of Quebec, 1929–1942
 Don Johnston (BCL 1958, BA 1960) – former Secretary General of the OECD
 Carlos Leitão (BA 1979) – Minister of Finance of Quebec, 2014–
 David Lewis (BA and LLD) – Rhodes Scholar and former leader of the New Democratic Party (1971–75)
 Alexander Cameron Rutherford (BA, LLB 1881) – first premier of Alberta, founder of the University of Alberta
 Bernard Shapiro (BA 1956) – Federal Ethics Commissioner, 2004–2007
 Marie-Claire Kirkland Strover (BA 1947, BCL 1950) – first woman elected to the Quebec National Assembly, serving between 1966 and 1973.

Foreign politicians and other government officials
McGill alumni have held and continue to hold many top government positions in other countries:

Heads of state/government
 Timothy Harris (PhD 2001) – current Prime Minister of Saint Kitts and Nevis
 John Rankin (LLM 1984) – current Governor-General of Bermuda
 Ahmed Nazif (PhD 1983) – former prime minister of Egypt
 Daniel Oduber Quirós (MA 1945) – former president of Costa Rica
 Vaira Vīķe-Freiberga (PhD 1965) – former president of Latvia; first female president of Latvia
 Joni Madraiwiwi (LLM 1989; DipA&SL 1988) – former acting president and vice-president of the Republic of Fiji and Chief Justice of the Supreme Court of the Republic of Nauru
 Michael Manley (BA 1943) – former prime minister of Jamaica, and former member of the Senate and House of Representatives in the Parliament of Jamaica
 Paula Cox (BA 1985) – former prime minister of Bermuda

Cabinet members
 Zbigniew Brzezinski (BA 1949; MA 1950) – former National Security Advisor (with Cabinet rank) to President Jimmy Carter 
Warren Randolph Burgess (MA 1915) – former United States Undersecretary of the Treasury and United States Ambassador to NATO
Miguel Castilla (BA 1991) – current Minister of Economy and Finance of Peru
Stephen Chebrot (MSc 2009) – current Minister for Transport in the Ugandan Cabinet and incumbent Member of the Parliament of Uganda, and former Ugandan Ambassador to India
Peter Murcott Bunting (BEng 1983) – current Minister of National Security of Jamaica
Bernard Chidzero (PhD 1958) – Minister of Finance of Zimbabwe, 1985–1995
Peng Ming-min (MA 1952) – senior adviser (with cabinet rank) to the president of Taiwan, and former presidential candidate in Taiwan
 Jacqui Quinn-Leandro (PhD 2003) – first female (acting) prime minister of Antigua and Barbuda, and cabinet member (Minister of Education, Minister of Labour, and Minister of Public Service)
 Michael Žantovský (MA 1975) –  Press Secretary and Presidential Spokesman of the Czech Republic
 Euan Howard, 4th Baron Strathcona and Mount Royal (BEng 1951) – British Minister of State for Defence, 1979–1981
 Jamaluddin Jarjis (PhD 1980) – former Malaysian ambassador to the United States and Minister of Science, Technology, and Innovation
 Dov Yosef (BA 1921) – Minister of Justice, Minister of Trade and Industry, and Minister of Health of the State of Israel
Marko Pavliha (DCL 1992) – Minister of Transport of Slovenia 
Malik Amin Aslam (MBA 1993) – former Pakistani Minister of State for the Environment and current advisor to the prime minister for Climate Change (with Cabinet rank)
Ian DeVere Archer (LLM 1968) – Secretary of Health and Social Security of Barbados and former chairman of Caribbean Airlines (national airline of Barbados)

Legislators
Wong Yuk-shan (MSc 1976; PhD 1979) – current Member (deputy) of the National People's Congress of the People's Republic of China
 Gilbert Cooper (BCom 1924) – former mayor of Hamilton, Bermuda and member of the House of Assembly of Bermuda
 S. I. Hayakawa (MA 1928) – U.S. Senator from California
James McCleary (BA 1874) – U.S. Congressman representing Minnesota in the United States House of Representatives 
Joseph J. O'Brien (BA 1917) – U.S. Congressman representing New York in the United States House of Representatives 
Chase G. Woodhouse (BA 1912; MA 1914) – U.S. Congresswoman representing Connecticut in the United States House of Representatives
Carlos Heredia (MA 1985) – Member of the Congress of Mexico and Governor of the State of Michoacán in Mexico
Gordon Wasserman, Baron Wasserman (BA 1959) – Member of the House of Lords in the British Parliament and life peer, and internationally recognized policing advisor
Conrad Black (MA 1973) – Member of the House of Lords in the British Parliament and life peer, and publisher of The Daily Telegraph (UK), Chicago Sun-Times (U.S.), The Jerusalem Post (Israel), National Post (Canada)
Euan Howard, 4th Baron Strathcona and Mount Royal (BEng 1951) – Member of the House of Lords in the British Parliament
 Andrew Hamilton Gault (BA 1902) – Conservative Member of the House of Commons in the British Parliament for Taunton, Somerset, UK (1924–1935); raised Princess Patricia's Canadian Light Infantry, the last privately raised regiment in the British Empire; bequeathed his Mont Saint-Hilaire estate to McGill in 1958
 Maurice Alexander (BA 1908; BCL 1910) – Liberal Member of the House of Commons in the British Parliament for Southwark South East, UK
 Gavin Henderson, 2nd Baron Faringdon (BA 1922) – former member of the London County Council, Chairman of the Fabian Society, 1960–1961
 Dhanayshar Mahabir (MA 1985; PhD 1994) – Senator of the Republic of Trinidad and Tobago
 Jacqui Quinn-Leandro (PhD 2003) – first woman elected to the House of Representatives, and later elected as Senator, in the Parliament of Antigua and Barbuda
 Ramasamy Palanisamy (MA 1980) – current Member of the Parliament of Malaysia
 Hidipo Hamutenya (MA 1971) – Member of the National Assembly of Namibia and cabinet member (Minister of Information and Broadcasting, Minister of Trade and Industry, and Minister of Foreign Affairs) of Namibia
 Michael Žantovský (MA 1975) – ambassador of Czechoslovakia/Czech Republic to the United States, Israel, and the United Kingdom, and Senator in the Parliament of the Czech Republic
Rıza Türmen (LLM 1980) –  former Member of the Turkish Parliament and Turkish Ambassador to Switzerland
Dov Yosef (BA 1921) – former member of the Israeli Parliament and Israel's Minister of Justice, Minister of Trade and Industry, and Minister of Health
Peter Murcott Bunting (BEng 1983) – current Member of Parliament of Jamaica
Marko Pavliha (DCL 1992) – Member of Parliament and Vice-President of the National Assembly of Slovenia

Supreme Court/High Court Justices
Akintola Olufemi Eyiwunmi (LLM 1964) – justice of the Supreme Court of Nigeria
Muhammad Khalid Masud (MA 1971; PhD 1973) – current justice of the Shariat Appellate Bench of the Supreme Court of Pakistan
Joni Madraiwiwi (LLM 1989; DipA&SL 1988) – Chief Justice of the Supreme Court of the Republic of Nauru
Chile Eboe-Osuji (LLM 1991) – judge and currently president (chief justice) of the International Criminal Court

Heads of financial institutions
Ernest Addison (PhD 1993) – banker, and current chairman and governor of the Central Bank of Ghana
Kofi Wampah (MA 1983; PhD 1986) – former chairman and governor of the Bank of Ghana, and Chairman of the Central Bank Governors of West Africa
DeLisle Worrell (MA 1973; PhD 1975) – former chairman and governor of the Central Bank of Barbados
Kazi Abdul Muktadir (BEng 1981) – acting Governor, and current deputy governor of the State Bank of Pakistan
P. Amarasinghe (MA 1974) – deputy governor of the Central Bank of Sri Lanka
Herbert Walker (BA 1946) governor of the Bank of Jamaica

Ambassadors
John L. Withers II (MA 1975) – ambassador of the United States to Albania
Francis Terry McNamara (MA 1954) – ambassador of the United States to Gabon, Cape Verde, and São Tomé and Príncipe
John Larkindale (PhD 1971) – ambassador of New Zealand to Russia and Australia
Kurt Jaeger (LLM 1989) –  current Ambassador of Liechtenstein to the United States
Rıza Türmen (LLM 1980) – ambassador of Turkey to Switzerland
Michael Žantovský (MA 1975) – ambassador of Czechoslovakia/Czech Republic to the United States, Israel, and the United Kingdom
Jamaluddin Jarjis (PhD 1980) – ambassador of Malaysia to the United States
Miguel Castilla (BA 1991) – ambassador of Peru to the United States
 John Rankin (LLM 1984) – ambassador of the United Kingdom to Sri Lanka, Nepal, and the Maldives

Others
Joanne Liu (BSc 1987; MD 1991; IMHL 2014) – international president of Médecins Sans Frontières (Doctors Without Borders)
Sam Nunberg (BA 2004) – former presidential political advisor to U.S. President Donald Trump
Ilya Sheyman (BA 2006) – social activist and Democratic candidate for the U.S. House of Representatives in the 2012 election
Morag Wise, Lady Wise (LLM 1994) – Scottish Senator of the College of Justice
 David Hackett (BA 1950) – boarding school friend of Robert F. Kennedy; founder and head of Lyndon B. Johnson's 1964 Volunteers in Service to America (VISTA), the domestic U.S. Peace Corps program; inspiration for Phineas in John Knowles's 1959 novel A Separate Peace; McGill hockey player and selected for the US Olympic Hockey Team (1952)
Wang Bingzhang (Phd 1982) – Chinese Dissident and Political Prisoner, the founding father of the overseas Chinese Democratic Movement.

Art, music, and film
 Ayal Adler – musician and composer 
 Will Aitken – novelist and film critic
 Patrick Allen – English actor and businessman, known for Shakespearean roles and for narrating the controversial Protect and Survive public information films for the British government
 Michael Andre – poet and editor
 Darcy James Argue – jazz composer and bandleader
 Burt Bacharach - American composer, songwriter, record producer and pianist
 Hadji Bakara – "sound manipulator" and secondary keyboardist for Wolf Parade
 Samantha Bee – correspondent, The Daily Show
 Yanic Bercier – drummer for death metal band Quo Vadis
 Mary E. Black – occupational therapist, teacher, master weaver and writer
 Claire Boucher – musician and visual artist under stage name Grimes
 Win Butler – musician, co-founder of Arcade Fire
 Peter Butterfield – concert tenor and conductor
 Anne Carson – poet and professor of classics
 Regine Chassagne – musician, co-founder of Arcade Fire
 John Austin Clark – music director and harpsichordist, co-founder of Bourbon Baroque
 Leonard Cohen – poet, author, songwriter, singer, Rock & Roll Hall of Fame inductee
 Sheldon Cohen – animator and illustrator of The Hockey Sweater
 Chuck Comeau – drummer and songwriter for band Simple Plan
 Hume Cronyn – actor, The Seventh Cross, Cocoon; studied theatre, left for Broadway without completing his degree
 Hubert Davis (BA 2000) – Oscar nominee for best documentary short subject
 Mackenzie Davis – actress and Canadian Screen Award nominee for The F Word
 Audrey Capel Doray – artist
 Christopher Downs – actor and entertainer in Taiwan and China, known there as 夏克立
 William Henry Drummond – Irish-born Canadian poet
 Louis Dudek – poet
 Arthur Erickson – architect (Robson Square, Vancouver; Canadian Chancery, Washington DC; Roy Thomson Hall; Museum of Anthropology, UBC; Simon Fraser University; Museum of Glass, Tacoma; California Plaza, San Diego Convention Center)
 Mary Fahl – singer and actress
 Colin Ferguson – actor, Eureka
 Karl Fischer – architect practicing in Montreal and New York City
 Jessalyn Gilsig – actress, Boston Public, NYPD Blue, Nip/Tuck, Glee
 Grace Glowicki – actress and filmmaker
 Evan Goldberg – co-writer of Superbad, Pineapple Express
 Jonathan Goldstein – author and radio producer, host of WireTap on CBC Radio One
 Chilly Gonzales – Grammy-nominated musician
 Linda Griffiths – playwright, actress
 Aaron Harris – percussionist/drummer, of Islands, Montreal-based indie rock group
 Sinjin Hawke – music producer and DJ
 Gavin Heffernan – director, Expiration
 Jennifer Irwin – actress, Still Standing
 Heather Juergensen – actress, co-screenwriter Kissing Jessica Stein
 Maxwell M. Kalman – architect, designed Canada's first mall Norgate shopping centre
 George Karpati
 Kid Koala, born Eric San – turntablist and musician
 Mia Kirshner – actress, The L Word
 Veronika Krausas – composer
 Christian Lander – author of the Stuff White People Like blog
 Robert Lantos – film producer
 Irving Layton – poet
 Stephen Leacock – humorist and economist
 Rachelle Lefevre – actress, Big Wolf on Campus, Twilight
 Daniel Levitin – writer, This Is Your Brain On Music; musician
 Julia Loktev – director of The Loneliest Planet, Day Night Day Night
 Brian Macdonald – choreographer and dancer in Canada, New York, and Europe
 Hugh MacLennan – writer, Two Solitudes, Barometer Rising
 Miles Mander – early film actor, director and novelist
 Ruth Marshall – actress who played in Flashpoint as the SRU's forensic psychologist
 Cameron Mathison – actor, All My Children
 Marc Mayer – art curator and director of the National Gallery of Canada
 Harry Mayerovitch – artist
 John McCrae – surgeon, poet, author of Canadian poem "In Flanders' Fields"
 Kate McGarrigle – musician and folk-singer 
 Dorothy McIlwraith – editor of Weird Tales, 1940–54
 Casey McKinnon – actress
 Sophia Michahelles – pageant puppet designer and co-artistic director, Processional Arts Workshop
 Raymond Moriyama – architect (Bata Shoe Museum, Toronto; Canadian Embassy, Tokyo; Ontario Science Centre; Toronto Reference Library; Canadian War Museum; Saudi Arabian National Museum, Riyadh)
 Suniti Namjoshi – writer
Heather O'Neill – writer
Alisa Palmer – playwright and theatre director
 Donald Patriquin – composer and organist
 Mauro Pezzente – bassist and co-founder of Godspeed You! Black Emperor
 Sam Roberts – musician
 John Rogers – writer/producer, Leverage
 Rebecca Rosenblum – writer, winner of the 2007 Metcalf-Rooke Award
 Dean Rosenthal – composer
 Moshe Safdie – architect (National Gallery of Canada, Vancouver Library, Salt Lake City Public Library, Musee de la Civilisation, Habitat '67)
 Robert Edison Sandiford – short story writer and essayist
 John Ralston Saul – Governor-General's-Award-winning philosophical author
 Robert William Service – poet and writer of the Yukon Gold Rush
 Mark Shainblum – author and comic book creator
 William Shatner – actor, Boston Legal; Captain James T. Kirk in Star Trek
 Jaspreet Singh – author, Seventeen Tomatoes
 Sonja Skarstedt – poet and illustrator
 Donald Steven – Juno Award and Jules Léger Prize winning composer
 Philippe Tatartcheff – Swiss-born poet and songwriter notable for writing songs in French with Anna and Kate McGarrigle
 Ruth Taylor – poet
 Gentile Tondino – artist
 J. Torres – comic book writer
 Zineb Triki – actress
Jessica Trisko – 2007 Miss Earth titleholder
 Ken Vandermark – jazz saxophonist and MacArthur Foundation "genius award" winner
Aquil Virani - artist
 Rufus Wainwright (briefly attended – dropped out upon record deal) – recording artist, musician
 William Weintraub – author, journalist and filmmaker (Why Rock the Boat?)
 Robert Stanley Weir – author (in 1908) of the English words to "O, Canada"
Matthew White – countertenor
 Jan Wong – Globe and Mail columnist ("Lunch with Jan Wong" series); author of books including award-winning Red China Blues and Jan Wong's China
 Royal Wood – singer-songwriter
 Estelí Gomez - Grammy winning musician, university instructor

Architects
For a full list of notable alumni and faculty from the School of Architecture, see:

Inventors
 Bernard Belleau – inventor of lamivudine, a drug used in the treatment of HIV and Hepatitis B infection
 Willard Boyle – inventor of the charge-coupled device
 Thomas Chang – creator of the first artificial cell
 James Creighton (Law 1880) – considered the originator of North American ice hockey rules
 Charles R. Drew (MDCM 1933) – black American medical pioneer; track star who led McGill to five intercollegiate titles; as medical advisor for the Blood for Britain program of World War II, the father of blood banks
 Lorne Elias (PhD 1956) – inventor of the explosives vapour detector EVD-1
 Alan Emtage – inventor of Archie, the grandfather of search engines
 Colonel Dr. Cluny MacPherson (MD 1901) – inventor of the MacPherson respirator gas mask during World War I
 Paul Moller – inventor of the Moller Skycar, a VTOL aircraft

Sports
 Betty Archdale – former captain (1934/5) of English women's cricket team
 Mike Babcock – NHL coach, formerly of the Toronto Maple Leafs; first and as of 2016 only coach to be a member of the Triple Gold Club, having won the Stanley Cup (Detroit, 2008), Olympic gold medal for men's ice hockey (2010, 2014), and the International Ice Hockey Federation (IIHF) Ice Hockey World Championship
 Russ Blinco – Montreal Maroons centre; 1935 NHL Rookie of the Year
 Guy Boucher – former head coach of the Ottawa Senators
 George Burnett – former head coach for the Edmonton Oilers
 Doug Carpenter – former head coach for the Toronto Maple Leafs and New Jersey Devils
 Randy Chevrier – former NFL and CFL player
 J. P. Darche – American football long snapper
 Jacques Dussault - Teacher and American and Canadian football Coach. Coach for the Montreal Machine, Montreal Alouettes and Montreal Carabins 
 Ken Dryden (LLB 1974) – politician, lawyer, businessman, author; retired National Hockey League goaltender from the Montreal Canadiens; former president of the Toronto Maple Leafs
 Laurent Duvernay-Tardif (MD, CM 2018) – American football player for the Kansas City Chiefs, graduated from McGill's Medical School in 2018; first medical doctor and first Quebecer to play and win the Super Bowl.
 Phil Edwards (MD 1936) – one of Canada's most decorated Olympians with 5 bronze medals
 Jack Gelineau – Boston Bruins and Chicago Blackhawks goaltender who won Calder Trophy as NHL Rookie of the Year in 1950
 Jennifer Heil (BComm) – 2006 Olympic gold medalist in freestyle skiing 
 George Hodgson (BEng 1916) – Canadian Olympic men's swim team (1912 and 1920); McGill's first athlete to win an Olympic gold medal; first Canadian to win two Olympic gold medals (Stockholm, 1916)
 Jackrabbit Johannsen – Norwegian-Canadian; credited with introducing cross-country skiing to North America; lived in retirement at McGill's Mont-Saint-Hilaire Gault Nature Reserve
 Charline Labonté (BEd – Physical Education) – 2006 Olympic gold medalist in women's ice hockey 
 R. Tait McKenzie – pioneer in college physical education; sculptor; physician
 James Naismith (BA 1887) – inventor of basketball; University of Kansas coach; namesake of six NCAA college basketball awards and the Naismith Memorial Basketball Hall of Fame
 Kevin O'Neill – former head coach of the Toronto Raptors; former head coach for USC Trojans men's basketball.
 Frank Patrick (BA 1908) – wrote much of the NHL rule book
 Hon. Sydney David Pierce (BA 1922, BCL 1925, LLD 1956) – 1924 Olympic swimmer and former Canadian ambassador to many countries
 Richard "Dick" Pound – former Olympic swimmer, former IOC vice president, chancellor of McGill, current chairman of the World Anti-Doping Agency (WADA)
Silver Quilty, Canadian Football Hall of Fame inductee, Canada's Sports Hall of Fame inductee, Canadian Amateur Hockey Association president
 Samantha Rapoport – NFL Director of Player Development, former Canada women's national football team and Montreal Blitz quarterback
 Kim St-Pierre (BEd 2005) – Canadian Olympic women's hockey team (2002 and 2006), McGill's first female athlete to become an Olympic gold medallist (Salt Lake City, 2002)
 Frank "Shag" Shaughnessy – first professional football coach hired by a Canadian university, he revolutionized Canadian college football by introducing the forward pass in 1921 in a game against Syracuse University and lobbied for a decade until the forward pass was adopted by the Canadian Rugby Football Union in 1931
Howard Stupp (born 1955) - Olympic wrestler
 Jack Wright (MDCM 1928) – 11-year veteran of Canadian Davis Cup team in the 1920s and 1930s
David Zilberman – Canadian Olympic heavyweight wrestler

Fictional characters
 Major Donald Craig, Canadian commando serving with British special forces during World War II, portrayed by Rock Hudson in the 1967 war movie Tobruk. Though the film was loosely based on real events, it's not clear whether or not Hudson's character was based on a real person. Most likely he was a pastiche character, given a Canadian background as cover for Hudson's inability to emulate a British accent.
 Dr. Walter Langkowski, researcher from the Marvel Comics Canadian superhero series Alpha Flight; portrayed as a McGill-based biophysicist researching the gamma radiation accident which created the Hulk; his discoveries transformed him into the superhero known as Sasquatch
 Lieutenant Alan McGregor, played by Gary Cooper, Lives of a Bengal Lancer (1935)
 Dr. Robert Richardson, played by Lew Ayres, Johnny Belinda (1948)
 Dr. James Wilson, oncologist and best friend to main character Gregory House in the Fox Network TV drama House

Others
Monroe Abbey – Canadian lawyer and Jewish civic leader
 Norman Bethune – as "Bai Qiu'en", subject of essay In Memory of Norman Bethune (in Quotations from Chairman Mao Tse-tung, Chapter 17: Serving the People) (Jinian Bai Qiu'en) by Mao Zedong; medical professor; became Red Army's medical chief and trained thousands of Chinese as medics and doctors; died in 1939 (from blood poisoning) during the Second Sino-Japanese War
 Frank E. Buck – horticulturalist
 Ian Campbell, 12th Duke of Argyll – Scottish peer and landowner
 Chi-Ming Chow – cardiologist and board member of the Heart and Stroke Foundation
Caroline Codsi: President and founder of Women in Governance and Board Member of Montreal Museum of Fine Arts
 Lawrence Moore Cosgrave – Canadian signer of the Japanese Instrument of Surrender
 Thomas Neill Cream – Glasgow-born serial killer of the 1800s, thought by some to have been Jack the Ripper
Jennifer Davidson - (BSW, 1991) child rights advocate and founding director of CELCIS, awarded an OBE in the Queen's Birthday Honours 2020 for services to the care and protection of children and young people in Scotland and abroad
Alanna Devine – founder of McGill Student Animal Legal Defence Fund and director of Animal Advocacy
 Victor Dzau (MD) – president of the Institute of Medicine of the National Academy of Sciences
 Rocco Galati – constitutional lawyer; challenged Justice Marc Nadon's appointment to the Supreme Court of Canada
 Charles Goren – world champion bridge player and bestselling author
 Bertha Hosang Mah, first Chinese woman to graduate from a Canadian university (McGill 1917)
 John Peters Humphrey – author of the first draft of the UN Universal Declaration of Human Rights
 Arnold Johnson – performed the first cardiac heart catheterization procedure in Canada in 1946
 Annie MacDonald Langstaff – in 1914 became McGill's and Quebec's first female law graduate but was not admitted to the Quebec bar until 2006 (posthumously); the Quebec bar did not admit women until 1941
 Neville Maxwell – British journalist; author of notable book on the Sino-Indian War
 Nancy Morris – first female rabbi in Scotland
 William Reginald Morse, Canadian author, medical doctor, and medical missionary in China
 Natasha Negovanlis – actress; singer; writer; host; LGBTQIA icon
 Madeleine Parent, Canadian labour, feminist and aboriginal rights activist
 Autumn Phillips – ex-wife of Peter Phillips, who is 18th in line for the British throne
 André Robert – father of the Canadian numerical weather prediction models
 Francis Scrimger (BA 1901, MDCM 1905) – Victoria Cross winner, 1915; Professor of Surgery and Chief of Surgery at the Children's Memorial Hospital
 Harmeet Singh Sooden – peace activist once held captive in Iraq
 Robert Thirsk – astronaut
 Dafydd Williams – astronaut
 Getachew Mekonnen – Economist 1999, Operations Research Analyst with the U.S. Department of Transportation, Federal Highway Administration (FHWA)

References

Macgill University
Macgill University
 
McGill University people